Gynecologic Oncology is a peer-reviewed medical journal covering all aspects of gynecologic oncology. The journal covers investigations relating to the etiology, diagnosis, and treatment of female cancers, as well as research from any of the disciplines related to this field of interest. It is published by Elsevier and is the official journal of the Society of Gynecologic Oncology.

Abstracting and indexing 
The journal is abstracted and indexed in Current Contents/Clinical Medicine, Index Medicus, Science Citation Index, and Scopus.

References

External links 
 

Elsevier academic journals
Monthly journals
Oncology journals
Publications established in 1972
English-language journals
Obstetrics and gynaecology journals